Famous People Players is a black light puppetry theatre company. It is based in Toronto, Ontario, Canada and tours worldwide. It is a non-profit organization that employs people with physical and intellectual disabilities. Those individuals share duties in dining room management, arts administration, and theatrical and visual arts performances.

Since inception, the company has paid homage to the works of famous people within its own theatrical context, hence the name Famous People Players.

History
The Famous People Players was founded on June 1, 1974, by Diane Dupuy of Hamilton, Ontario. At inception, the company consisted of Dupuy and an assistant, eleven performers, and Dupuy's mother Mary Thornton; Thornton designed and built the costumes and props.

The company's original piece was Aruba Liberace, in which a life-size character of Liberace plays the piano. It is still the company's signature performance. Liberace attended a showing of Aruba Liberace, and was so impressed he invited Famous People Players to perform with him in Las Vegas. The company debuted in Las Vegas in October 1975; over the subsequent ten years, the company performed with Liberace both in Las Vegas and internationally.

As a result of the increasing popularity of Famous People Players, the company was featured as regulars on CBC Television's 1976-1977 variety series, The Wolfman Jack Show; the network also later produced and aired Carnival of the Animals. In 1980, Sorcerer Apprentice premiered at Radio City Music Hall in New York. In 1982, Famous People Players was invited to perform in the People's Republic of China. The company's first Broadway Show, A Little Like Magic, opened at the Lyceum Theatre in New York City and ran for 49 performances in 1985. They returned to New York in 1994 for a 4-week run, under the sponsorship of Phil Collins and actor Paul Newman, where they performed the show A Little More Magic for inner city kids to dream BIG!

Dine and Dream Theatre
In 1994, the company opened the Dine and Dream Theatre; Paul Newman funded the restaurant's development from some of the proceeds of Newman's Own products and Phil Collins funded the theatre's sound system. In 2009, facing the demolition of its 25-year location, the company moved further west to a new location. Despite damage caused by storms and unexpected costs from the city of Toronto, the company survived and opened its first show in its new location on October 23, 2009.

The Dine and Dream Theatre is located at the company's Toronto west-end headquarters. Guests first arrive to the restaurant for dinner, where they are served by individuals who also perform in Famous People Players productions. After dinner, they are led to the Phil Collins Theatre, where the main production is performed. The theatre is named after Phil Collins, who became a source of inspiration for the actors when he viewed a performance interpretation of his music. It is currently the only theatre in Canada exclusively devoted to puppetry performance.

Recognition
The troupe has been subject of numerous talk shows, specials and documentaries. A 1984 CBS movie-of-the-week entitled Special People was based on the company's early history. A Little Like Magic, which detailed the company's operation and success, was an Emmy Award-winning documentary. The company was also featured in the plot of an episode of the popular U.S. television drama 7th Heaven in 2002.

In co-production with Treehouse's "Roll Play" Famous PEOPLE Players program for the juice box set  is hugely popular.  The theatre troupe first broke into this market with their Toronto Dinner Theatre as a guest spot location for Treehouse kingpin "This is Daniel Cook."

Founder Diane Dupuy has been inducted as a member of the Order of Canada in recognition for her contributions to Canadian society through the company and mother Mary C. Thornton has won many accolades, most recently with The Toastmasters as woman of the year.

Productions
Famous People Players has created many productions over its 45-year history. (Note: The table below is currently incomplete.)

Leave the Porch Light On was the company's first original, full-length musical production and was created for the company's 25th-anniversary. The initial performance of Leave the Porchlight On was attended by a number of celebrities and other well-known people, including the Governor General of Canada. The production was very successful and is still occasionally performed at the company's theatre in Toronto and on tour. A sequel of sorts followed two years later, entitled Hide and Seek: A Game of Human Spirit.

References

External links
 Famous People Players

Theatre companies in Toronto
Disability theatre
Puppet theaters
Puppet troupes
Puppetry in Canada